Wolf Creek is a stream in Cooper County in the U.S. state of Missouri. It is a tributary of Cave Creek.

Wolf Creek was named after an early settler with the last name Wolf.

See also
List of rivers of Missouri

References

Rivers of Cooper County, Missouri
Rivers of Missouri